The 2007-08 Cypriot First Division started on 1 September 2007. The defending champions were APOEL. 

This year, for the first time, the championship featured a group stage play-off system. Teams were divided into 3 groups; 1st-4th, 5th-8th and 9th-12th. The points were carried over from the first round.

Anorthosis won the championship three games before the end of the season, without losing a single match.

Format
Fourteen teams participated in the 2007–08 Cypriot First Division. Each team played against every other team twice, once at home and once away, for a total of 26 matches. After these matches, the two teams with the worst records were relegated to the 2008–09 Cypriot Second Division. The remaining twelve teams were divided into three groups: 1st-4th, 5th-8th and 9th-12th. 

The teams ranked first through fourth played out the champion and the participants for the European competitions. Teams ranked ninth through 12th determined the third relegated club, while the remaining four teams played a placement round. Every team played twice against its group opponents. Regular season records are carried over without any modifications.

The champions ensured their participation in the 2008–09 UEFA Champions League and the runners-up in the 2008–09 UEFA Cup.

The teams had to declare their interest to participate in the 2008 UEFA Intertoto Cup before the end of the championship. At the end of the championship, the higher placed team among the interested ones participated in the Intertoto Cup (if they had not secured their participation in any other UEFA competition).

Point system
Teams received three points for a win, one point for a draw and zero points for a loss.

Teams

Promotion and relegation (pre-season)
Digenis Morphou, Ayia Napa and AEP Paphos were relegated at the end of the 2006–07 season after finishing in the bottom three places of the table. 

The relegated teams were replaced by 2006–07 Second Division champions APOP Kinyras, runners-up Alki Larnaca and third-placed team Doxa Katokopias.

Stadia and locations

First round

League table

Results

Second round
The first 12 teams were divided into 3 groups. Points were carried over from the first round.

Group A

Table

Results

Group B

Table

Results

Group C

Table

Results

Top scorers

Last Update: 11 May 2008Source: soccerboards.com

Sources

See also
2007–08 Cypriot Cup
2007–08 Cypriot Second Division
2007–08 in Cypriot football

Notes

Cypriot First Division seasons
Cyprus
1